Karen Gibson could refer to: 

Karen Gibson (choir conductor), British musician
Karen Gibson (Sergeant at Arms), U.S. Army general and government official